"(Let's Get Together) One Last Time" is a song written by Billy Sherrill and George Richey, and recorded by American country music artist Tammy Wynette. It was released in January 1977 as the first single from the album Let's Get Together.

Background and reception
"Let's Get Together" was first recorded in December 1976 at the Columbia Recording Studio in Nashville, Tennessee. Additional tracks were recorded during this session, which would ultimately become part of Wynette's studio album Let's Get Together. The session was produced by Billy Sherrill.

The song reached number 6 on the Billboard Hot Country Singles chart. It released on her studio album Let's Get Together.

Track listings
7" vinyl single
 "(Let's Get Together) One Last Time" – 2:27
 "Hardly a Day Goes By" – 2:40

Charts

References 

1977 songs
1977 singles
Tammy Wynette songs
Song recordings produced by Billy Sherrill
Songs written by Billy Sherrill
Songs written by George Richey
Epic Records singles